Yuan Yue (born 25 September 1998) is a Chinese professional tennis player.

Yuan has a career-high WTA singles ranking of world No. 74 and a best WTA doubles ranking of world No. 281.

Career
She made her WTA Tour main-draw debut at the 2018 Jiangxi International Open in the doubles tournament, partnering with Liu Yanni.

She made her Grand Slam main-draw debut at the 2022 Wimbledon Championships as a lucky loser.
At the next major, she reached the third round for the first time after qualifying at the US Open.

Performance timeline

Only main-draw results in WTA Tour, Grand Slam tournaments, Fed Cup/Billie Jean King Cup and Olympic Games are included in win–loss records.

Singles
Current through the 2023 Australian Open.

WTA 125 tournament finals

Doubles: 1 (1 runner-up)

ITF Circuit finals

Singles: 13 (4 titles, 9 runner-ups)

Doubles: 4 (2 titles, 2 runner-ups)

Notes

References

External links
 
 

1998 births
Living people
Chinese female tennis players
21st-century Chinese women